Nikita may refer to:
 Nikita (given name)
 Nikita, Crimea, a town in Crimea
 Nikita the Tanner, a character in East Slavic folklore

Film and television
Little Nikita, a 1988 film
La Femme Nikita (film), also known as Nikita, a 1990 French-language film starring Anne Parillaud and directed by Luc Besson
Point of No Return (film), a 1993 American adaptation of the 1990 film Nikita starring Bridget Fonda and directed by John Badham
La Femme Nikita (TV series), a 1997–2001 Canadian television series based on 1990 film by Luc Besson, broadcast as Nikita in Canada, starring Peta Wilson
Nikita (TV series), a 2010–2013 American television series on The CW starring Maggie Q

Music
 NikitA, a Ukrainian female band
 "Nikita" (song), by Elton John